True to Life is Lisette Melendez' second studio album and was released in 1994 by Def Jam.  Melendez' hit single "Goody Goody" from this album was extremely popular in Japan.

Track listing

References

1994 albums
Lisette Melendez albums